Collections maintenance
Conservation and restoration of cultural property
Preservation (library and archive)
Risk management (cultural property)